Strawberries and cream can refer to:

 a traditional English dessert made with strawberries
 the inedible fungus Hydnellum peckii
 Strawberries and Cream (album), the second studio album by American comedy rock duo Ninja Sex Party
 "Strawberries and Cream" (The Mentalist), a two-part season finale for the television series The Mentalist